Dmitry Lisakovich (born 10 October 1999) is a Belarusian professional footballer who plays for Torpedo-BelAZ Zhodino.

His brothers Vitaly Lisakovich and Ruslan Lisakovich are also professional footballers.

References

External links 
 
 

1999 births
Living people
Belarusian footballers
Belarusian men's futsal players
Association football midfielders
FC Uzda players
FC Krumkachy Minsk players
FC Torpedo Minsk players
FC Isloch Minsk Raion players
FC Torpedo-BelAZ Zhodino players